The Southern University System is a system of public historically black universities in the U.S. state of Louisiana. Its headquarters are at the Joseph Samuel Clark Administration Building on the Southern University campus in Baton Rouge. The Southern University System is the only historically black college system in the United States.

Institutions
The Southern University System has five institutions located throughout the state. Each institution operates its own budget and each has a chancellor.

Southern University and A&M College at Baton Rouge (flagship school)
Southern University at New Orleans
Southern University at Shreveport
Southern University Law Center in Baton Rouge (law school)
Southern University Agricultural Research and Extension Center in Baton Rouge

Southern University Laboratory School

Southern University Laboratory School (Southern Lab) is a laboratory school under Southern University's College of Education that serves students in K-12 grades; it is located on the Baton Rouge campus.  The school has been operating since 1922.

See also

List of colleges and universities in Louisiana

References

External links

Southern University
 
Public university systems in the United States
Historically black universities and colleges in the United States
1974 establishments in Louisiana